Oughterside and Allerby is a civil parish in Allerdale district, Cumbria, England. In the 2011 census it had a population of 619.  The north western boundary of the parish is a short stretch of coast, then, working clockwise, the parish is bordered by Hayton and Mealo to the north, Aspatria to the north east, Plumbland to the south east, Gilcrux to the south and Crosscanonby to  the south west. The A596 road from Aspatria to Maryport passes through the parish, and the B5300 road follows its coastline in the north west. The main settlements in the parish are Allerby in the west and Oughterside and Prospect, in the east.

Governance
Oughterside and Allerby is in the parliamentary constituency of Workington, Mark Jenkinson is the Member of parliament.

It is in the Silloth & Solway Coast Ward of Allerdale Borough Council and the Dearham and Broughton Ward of Cumbria County Council.

Oughterside and Allerby has a  parish council.

Listed buildings

 there are three listed buildings in the parish, all at Grade II.

References

External links
 Cumbria County History Trust: Oughterside and Allerby (nb: provisional research only – see Talk page)

Civil parishes in Cumbria
Allerdale